The Tar River is a river that is approximately  long, in northeast North Carolina flowing generally southeast to an estuary of Pamlico Sound.  The Tar River becomes the tidal Pamlico River once it underpasses the U.S. Highway 17 Bridge in Washington, North Carolina.

North Carolina was originally a naval stores colony—that is, the blanket of long leaf pines that covered the coastal plain was used by the British Navy for ships' masts and the pine pitch was used to manufacture tar caulking for vessels.  The river derives its name from its historic use as a major route for tar-laden barges as they headed to the sea. The city of Tarboro is on the banks of the river. Recent research conducted by East Carolina University, Greenville and Pitt County historians has uncovered documentation noting that before the Civil War, the North Carolina Legislature had appropriated funds to construct dams and locks on the Tar River in an attempt to facilitate almost year-round navigation for the farm products and naval stores shipping plus passenger boats which were travelling between Tarboro, through Greenville to Washington.

Among the towns and cities along its course are Louisburg, Rocky Mount, Tarboro, and Greenville.  The village of Old Sparta was formerly an important riverport on the Tar, but declined in the 20th century.

One account of the significance of the river's name comes from the Civil War.

It may have been inspired by an incident back in North Carolina. As the Confederates prepared to evacuate Washington, NC, in March 1862, they sent squads up and down the Tar River to destroy all the stocks of cotton and naval stores which had been prepared by the small farms along the river, to prevent them from falling into the hands of the Union soldiers. At Taft’s store they found over 1,000 barrels of turpentine and tar. The amount was too large to burn, as it would take several houses with it. So the barrels were rolled into the river, where the hoops were cut in two and the contents dumped into the river. Three months later, in June, four hundred Union prisoners of war were sent from Salisbury, NC to Washington, NC, to be exchanged for Confederate prisoners. Before coming into Washington, the soldiers asked permission to bathe in the river and clean themselves up. Guards were posted along the river banks, and the prisoners were allowed to strip then wade into the river to wash. Instead, they stirred up the river bottom so much that the tar smeared their bodies completely, each man coming out of the water with a stick to scour the tar off their bodies and legs. One Confederate yelled out, "Hello boys, what’s the matter?" The reply from the disgusted Yankee soldier was, "We have heard of Tar River all our lives but never believed that there really was any such place, but damned if we haven’t found it, the whole bed of it is tar!"

The river was strongly affected by Hurricane Floyd in 1999 and caused much flooding in the area. The Tar River suffered the worst flooding from the hurricane, exceeding 500-year flood levels along its lower stretches; it crested 24 feet (7.3 m) above flood stage. In Greenville it crested at 29.74 ft. (9.1 m)

The river was again affected by Hurricane Matthew in 2016.

An endangered species, the Tar River Spinymussel is found in limited areas of the Tar and Nuese River basins.

References

External links
 

Rivers of North Carolina
Rivers of Beaufort County, North Carolina
Rivers of Franklin County, North Carolina
Rivers of Edgecombe County, North Carolina
Rivers of Pitt County, North Carolina
Tributaries of Pamlico Sound